Ejido el Vergel or El Vergel is a town in Balleza Municipality in the Mexican state of Chihuahua. The town has a population of 1823.

Climate

References 

Populated places in Chihuahua (state)